Polygraphus is a genus of beetles belonging to the family Curculionidae.

The species of this genus are found in Eurasia and Northern America.

Species:
 Polygraphus abietis Kurenzov, 1941a
 Polygraphus aequalis Schedl

References

Curculionidae
Curculionidae genera